Walt Hameline (born August 16, 1951) is an American college athletics administrator and former college football coach. He is the athletic director at Wagner College in Staten Island, New York.  Hameline was the head football coach from at Wagner from 1981 to 2014, compiling a record of 224–139–2 and guiding them to the NCAA Division III Football Championship in 1987. Wagner College is currently an NCAA Division I Football Championship Subdivision (FCS) program that is a member of the Northeast Conference.

Wagner football teams under Hameline's guidance finished with winning records 23 times in his career. In November 2010, he reached the 200-win mark as Wagner defeated Monmouth, 31–20.

Hameline lives with his wife in Colts Neck Township, New Jersey.

Head coaching record

See also
 List of college football coaches with 200 wins
 List of college football coaches with 100 losses

References

External links
 Wagner profile

1951 births
Living people
American football linebackers
Brockport Golden Eagles football players
Brown Bears football coaches
Wagner Seahawks athletic directors
Wagner Seahawks football coaches
University at Albany, SUNY alumni 
People from Colts Neck Township, New Jersey